João Paulo Cunha (born 1958) is a deputy of the Brazilian Workers Party from São Paulo and was elected President of the Chamber of Deputies in 2003. He left this position in 2005.

In August 2012, whilst running the Brazilian municipal election in Osasco, Cunha was forced to pull out after he was convicted of corruption and money laundering. According to the accusation he received $24,000 (£15,000) from a businessman who was awarded a contract with Congress.

References

Workers' Party (Brazil) politicians
Living people
Presidents of the Chamber of Deputies (Brazil)
Brazilian politicians convicted of corruption
1958 births